Sümeg is a town in Veszprém county, Hungary. Sümeg is mostly known for Sümeg Castle.

Twin towns – sister cities

Sümeg is twinned with:
 Aichtal, Germany

 Sovata, Romania
 Tapolca, Hungary
 Vobarno, Italy

References

External links

  in Hungarian

Populated places in Veszprém County